Korođ or Korog is a village in the municipality of Tordinci, Vukovar-Syrmia County, Croatia. Korođ is one of the oldest Hungarian settlements in the area of present day Croatia dating back at least to some time before 1290 when the fortification was constructed at this spot. The village is named after Hungarian noble family of Kórógy. Only 2 out of 274 male over 21 years were recognised their right to vote at the 1920 Kingdom of Serbs, Croats and Slovenes Constitutional Assembly election with the same practice continuing at the 1923 elections.

See also
 Hungarians of Croatia

References

Sources
 

Populated places in Vukovar-Syrmia County
Hungarian-speaking territorial units in Croatia